Bonnie Woods is an American former Scientologist and critic of the Church of Scientology. Woods resides in Britain. She was a member of the Sea Org within Scientology, and left in 1982. She and her family were monitored by a private investigator. The Church of Scientology spread pamphlets around her East Grinstead neighbourhood making negative claims about her. Woods sued for libel against the organization – in response Scientology filed three libel suits against her. Her case eventually reached the High Court of Justice. Scientology paid her for costs and damages, and admitted that the claims it had made about her were false.

Scientology

Leaving the organization
An American who moved to Britain, Bonnie Woods had been a member of the Sea Organization but left Scientology in 1982. Since 1992, she and her husband Richard have run a telephone helpline for families affected by Scientology. Scientologists declared her a "Suppressive Person", picketing her house and around East Grinstead and putting her family under surveillance. She and her family were followed by a private investigator, and a creditor of theirs was located and provided free legal assistance to sue them. Woods told a local paper, "The biggest concern I have is for my children. Obviously I worry about their safety. I can never let them answer the phone or the door." Private investigator Eugene Ingram persuaded a creditor of Richard Woods' failed building firm to accept free help from Scientologists to pursue her money. As a result, the family was bankrupted.

Libel litigation
The Church spread leaflets calling her a "hate campaigner" around her East Grinstead neighbourhood and on the High Street. Woods sued for libel, and in response the Church took out three libel suits against her. In 1999, after six years of litigation, eventually reaching the High Court, the Church of Scientology admitted that the claims were untrue and paid damages and costs. She told journalists that during the case she had been subjected to a "level of harassment that most people would find intolerable".

See also

Fair Game (Scientology)
Office of Special Affairs
Scientology controversies
Scientology and the legal system
Scientology in the United Kingdom

References

External links

Scientology Apologises to Bonnie Woods, June 8, 1999, High Court of Justice
Interview with Bonnie Woods, April 13, 2008.
Bonnie Woods, archived news articles
Bonnie Woods: Former scientologist, former Sea Org staff member, archived news articles
How Scientology handles truth, Lermanet
Richard and Bonnie Woods, FACTnet

Living people
American former Scientologists
Critics of Scientology
American whistleblowers
American expatriates in the United Kingdom
Year of birth missing (living people)